The Pact of Steel, formally known as the Pact of Friendship and Alliance between Germany and Italy, was a military and political alliance between Italy and Germany.

The pact was initially drafted as a tripartite military alliance between Japan, Italy and Germany. While Japan wanted the focus of the pact to be aimed at the Soviet Union, Italy and Germany wanted the focus of it to be aimed at the British Empire and France. Due to this disagreement, the pact was signed without Japan and as a result, it became an agreement which only existed between Fascist Italy and Nazi Germany, signed on 22 May 1939 by foreign ministers Galeazzo Ciano of Italy and Joachim von Ribbentrop of Germany.

The pact consisted of two parts. The first section was an open declaration of continuing trust and co-operation between Germany and Italy. The second section, the "Secret Supplementary Protocol", encouraged a union of policies concerning the military and the economy.

Background
Germany and Italy fought against each other in World War I. Popularity and support for radical political parties (such as the Nazis of Adolf Hitler and the Fascists of Benito Mussolini) exploded after the Great Depression had severely hampered the economies of both countries.

In 1922, Mussolini secured his position as Prime Minister of the Kingdom of Italy. His first actions made him immensely popular - massive programs of public works provided employment and transformed Italy's infrastructure. In the Mediterranean, Mussolini built a powerful navy, larger than the combined might of the British and French Mediterranean fleets.

When he was appointed Chancellor in 1933, Hitler initiated a huge wave of public works and secret rearmament. Fascism and Nazism shared similar principles and Hitler and Mussolini met on several state and private occasions in the 1930s. On 23 October 1936, Italy and Germany signed a secret protocol aligning their foreign policy for the first time on such issues as the Spanish Civil War, the League of Nations and the Abyssinia Crisis.

Japan
In 1931, Japanese forces invaded the region of Manchuria because of its rich grain fields and reserves of raw minerals. This, however, provoked a diplomatic clash with the Soviet Union, which bordered Manchuria. To combat this Soviet threat, the Japanese signed a Pact with Germany in 1936. The aim of the pact was to guard against any attack from Soviet Russia were it to move on China.

Japan elected to focus on anti-Soviet alliances instead of anti-Western alliances like Italy and Germany. Germany, however, feared that an anti-USSR alliance would create the possibility of a two-front war before they could conquer Western Europe. So when Italy invited Japan to sign the Pact of Steel, it demurred.

Clauses
Officially, the Pact of Steel obliged Germany and Italy to aid the other country militarily, economically or otherwise in the event of war, and to collaborate in wartime production. The Pact aimed to ensure that neither country was able to make peace without the agreement of the other. The agreement was based on the assumption that a war would not occur within three years. When Germany invaded Poland on 1 September 1939 and war broke out on 3 September, Italy was not yet prepared for conflict and had difficulty meeting its obligations. Consequently, Italy did not enter World War II until June 1940, with a delayed invasion of Southern France.

Secret supplementary protocols
The secret supplementary protocols of the Pact of Steel, which were split into two sections, were not made public at the time of the signing of the Pact.

The first section urged the countries to quicken their joint military and economic cooperation whilst the second section committed the two countries to cooperate in "matters of press, the news service and the propaganda" to promote the power and image of the Rome-Berlin Axis. To aid in this, each country was to assign "one or several specialists" of their country in the capital city of the other for close liaisons with the Foreign Minister of that country.

Name change
After being told the original name, "Pact of Blood", would likely be poorly received in Italy, Mussolini proposed the name "Pact of Steel", which was ultimately chosen.

Dissolution
According to Article VII, the pact was to last 10 years, but this did not happen. In November 1942, the Axis forces in North Africa, led by Field Marshal Erwin Rommel, were decisively defeated by the British and British Commonwealth forces at the Second Battle of El Alamein. In July 1943 the Western Allies opened up a new front by invading Sicily. In the aftermath of this, Mussolini was overthrown by 19 members of the Gran Consiglio who voted in favour of the Ordine Grandi. The new Italian government, under Field Marshal Pietro Badoglio, signed an armistice with the Allies in September and became a non-belligerent, thus effectively ending Italy's involvement in the pact.

Although a puppet government under Mussolini, the Italian Social Republic, was established in Northern Italy by Nazi Germany, Italy continued as a member of the pact in name only.

See also 

 Anti-Comintern Pact 
 Causes of World War II
 Tripartite Pact

References
Notes

Bibliography
Print
 
 
 
 
 
 
 
 

Online
 
 

Media
 
 

1939 in Germany
1939 in Italy
20th-century military alliances
Germany–Italy relations
Military alliances involving Italy
Military alliances involving Nazi Germany
Treaties concluded in 1939
Treaties entered into force in 1939
Treaties of the Kingdom of Italy (1861–1946)
World War II treaties
May 1939 events
Axis powers